Charles Walter Machemehl (born April 20, 1946) is an American former Major League Baseball pitcher. Currently a rancher and businessman in Central Texas, the graduate of Texas Christian University was drafted by the Cleveland Indians in 1968, and played for them during the 1971 season.

In 14 Major League games, all in relief, Machemehl lost his only two decisions, but earned three saves with seven games finished. In 18⅓ innings pitched, he allowed 16 hits and 15 bases on balls, with only nine strikeouts.

References

External links

1946 births
Living people
Baseball players from Texas
Cleveland Indians players
Denver Bears players
Major League Baseball pitchers
Omaha Royals players
People from Brenham, Texas
Reno Silver Sox players
Rock Hill Indians players
Savannah Indians players
TCU Horned Frogs baseball players
Wichita Aeros players